Parental Guidance is a 2012 American family comedy film directed by Andy Fickman, from a screenplay written by Lisa Addario, and Joe Syracuse. It stars Billy Crystal, Bette Midler, Marisa Tomei, and Tom Everett Scott, and follows a couple who are asked to look after their grandchildren by their skeptical daughter, while she and her husband are out of town.

The film  was the final 20th Century Fox one to be financed by Dune Entertainment as part of a deal with the studio; shortly after, the company merged with RatPac Entertainment and struck a financing deal with Warner Bros. It was theatrically released on December 25, 2012 to negative reviews from critics but was a commercial success, grossing $119.8 million from a $25 million budget.

Plot
Artie Decker, a sports commentator for the minor league Fresno Grizzlies, is fired due to his old-fashioned personality and lack of social media savvy. After telling his wife Diane the news, they get a phone call from their daughter Alice and son-in-law, Phil, asking them to babysit their three children Harper, Turner, and Barker while the couple leaves for an entrepreneur convention in Hilton Head, South Carolina. Problems arise as Artie and Diane's laidback personalities collide with Phil and Alice's helicopter parenting. After learning of the children's various problems, such as Harper's high achievement syndrome, Turner's stutter, and Barker's imaginary friend, Carl the Kangaroo, Artie and Diane try to bond with them.

Alice returns home early when her boss gives her an assignment to redesign the website for the X Games. Artie uses this to his advantage and he arranges an interview for the role of sports commentator. In an attempt to win over his grandchildren, he breaks several of the rules Alice has set for them, such as forbidding them from eating sugary foods and watching horror movies. Alice is horrified, but after Diane tells her that she and Artie will never be good grandparents if she doesn't give them the chance to, she leaves to join Phil in Hilton Head.

Artie lets Barker skip school to take him to a skate park where his job interview is being held. Barker escapes from his supervision and nearly gets hurt by a skateboard ridden by Tony Hawk, which is later shown on the news. Later that day, Diane berates Artie for letting Turner hit his bully after Artie had tried to teach him a lesson about confidence and standing up for himself. Artie has a discussion with him and shows him the Shot Heard 'Round The World event. Meanwhile, Phil and Alice catch the news broadcast of Artie and Barker's skatepark incident and return to Atlanta. The tension comes to a head when Alice discovers Diane has allowed Harper to attend a party the night before a violin recital and Barker claims Carl has been hit and killed by a car.

Alice eventually reconciles with Artie and Diane, and, sensing that Harper has lost her passion for music, allows Harper to withdraw from the recital. Turner takes her place on stage and overcomes his stutter by reciting the commentary from Shot Heard 'Round The World. Afterward, Artie and Diane successfully reconnect with their grandchildren, and Artie takes up a new job as a commentator for an Atlanta Little League Baseball team.

Cast
 Billy Crystal as Artie Decker
 Bette Midler as Diane Decker
 Marisa Tomei as Alice Decker-Simmons
 Tom Everett Scott as Phil Simmons
 Bailee Madison as Harper Simmons
 Joshua Rush as Turner Simmons
 Kyle Breitkopf as Barker Simmons
 Gedde Watanabe as Mr. Cheng
 Rhoda Griffis as Dr. Schveer
 Jennifer Crystal Foley as Cassandra
 Tony Hawk as himself
 Steve Levy as himself
 Linda Cohn as herself

Release
The film was released Christmas Day 2012, in the United States and Canada and on Boxing Day 2012, in Australia, the United Kingdom, and Ireland. Its international release spans from December 19, 2012, to July 11, 2013, with the first 2013 release on January 3, 2013, in the Dominican Republic, Venezuela, and Singapore.

Home media
The film was released on DVD and Blu-ray on March 26, 2013, from 20th Century Fox Home Entertainment.

Reception
Despite generally negative reviews, box office totals for the film were higher than expected.

Rotten Tomatoes gives the film an approval rating of 17% based on 92 reviews with an average rating of 3.84/10. The website's critical consensus states: "Parental Guidance is sweet but milquetoast, an inoffensive trifle that's blandly predictable." Metacritic gives it a weighted average score of 36 out of 100, based on reviews from 20 critics, indicating "generally unfavorable reviews". Audiences polled by CinemaScore gave it an average grade of "A−" on an A+ to F scale.

Accolades

References

External links

 
 
 
 
 

2012 films
2010s children's comedy films
20th Century Fox films
American children's comedy films
Dune Entertainment films
Films scored by Marc Shaiman
Films about families
Films directed by Andy Fickman
Films produced by Peter Chernin
Films set in Atlanta
Films set in Fresno, California
Films shot in Atlanta
Walden Media films
2012 comedy films
Chernin Entertainment films
Films about parenting
2010s English-language films
2010s American films